The Third Geneva Convention, relative to the treatment of prisoners of war, is one of the four treaties of the Geneva Conventions. The Geneva Convention relative to the Treatment of Prisoners of War was first adopted in 1929, but significantly revised at the 1949 conference. It defines humanitarian protections for prisoners of war. There are 196 state parties to the Convention.

Part I: General provisions 

This part sets out the overall parameters for GCIII:

 Articles 1 and 2 cover which parties are bound by GCIII
 Article 2 specifies when the parties are bound by GCIII
 That any armed conflict between two or more "High Contracting Parties" is covered by GCIII;
 That it applies to occupations of a "High Contracting Party";
 That the relationship between the "High Contracting Parties" and a non-signatory, the party will remain bound until the non-signatory no longer acts under the strictures of the convention. "...Although one of the Powers in conflict may not be a party to the present Convention, the Powers who are parties thereto shall remain bound by it in their mutual relations. They shall furthermore be bound by the Convention in relation to the said Power, if the latter accepts and applies the provisions thereof."
 Article 3 has been called a "Convention in miniature." It is the only article of the Geneva Conventions that applies in non-international conflicts. It describes minimal protections which must be adhered to by all individuals within a signatory's territory during an armed conflict not of an international character (regardless of citizenship or lack thereof): Non-combatants, members of armed forces who have laid down their arms, and combatants who are hors de combat (out of the fight) due to wounds, detention, or any other cause shall in all circumstances be treated humanely, including prohibition of outrages upon personal dignity, in particular humiliating and degrading treatment. The passing of sentences must also be pronounced by a regularly constituted court, affording all the judicial guarantees which are recognised as indispensable by civilised peoples. Article 3's protections exist even if one is not classified as a prisoner of war. Article 3 also states that parties to the internal conflict should endeavour to bring into force, by means of special agreements, all or part of the other provisions of GCIII.
 Article 4 defines prisoners of war to include:
4.1.1 Members of the armed forces of a Party to the conflict and members of militias of such armed forces
4.1.2 Members of other militias and members of other volunteer corps, including those of organised resistance movements, provided that they fulfill all of the following conditions:
 that of being commanded by a person responsible for his subordinates;
 that of having a fixed distinctive sign recognisable at a distance (there are limited exceptions to this among countries who observe the 1977 Protocol I);
 that of carrying arms openly;
 that of conducting their operations in accordance with the laws and customs of war.
4.1.3 Members of regular armed forces who profess allegiance to a government or an authority not recognised by the Detaining Power.
4.1.4 Civilians who have non-combat support roles with the military and who carry a valid identity card issued by the military they support.
4.1.5 Merchant marine and the crews of civil aircraft of the Parties to the conflict, who do not benefit by more favourable treatment under any other provisions of international law.
4.1.6 Inhabitants of a non-occupied territory, who on the approach of the enemy spontaneously take up arms to resist the invading forces, without having had time to form themselves into regular armed units, provided they carry arms openly and respect the laws and customs of war.
 4.3 makes explicit that Article 33 takes precedence for the treatment of medical personnel of the enemy and chaplains of the enemy.
 Article 5 specifies that prisoners of war (as defined in article 4) are protected from the time of their capture until their final repatriation. It also specifies that when there is any doubt whether a combatant belongs to the categories in article 4, they should be treated as such until their status has been determined by a competent tribunal.

Part II: General Protection of Prisoners of War

This part of the convention covers the status of prisoners of war.

Article 12 states that prisoners of war are the responsibility of the state, not the persons who capture them, and that they may not be transferred to a state that is not party to the Convention.

Articles 13 to 16 state that prisoners of war must be treated humanely without any adverse discrimination and that their medical needs must be met.

Part III: Captivity
This part is divided into several sections:

Section 1 covers the beginning of captivity (Articles 17–20). It dictates what information a prisoner must give ("surname, first names and rank, date of birth, and army, regimental, personal or serial number"), and interrogation methods that the detaining power may use ("No physical or mental torture, nor any other form of coercion"). It dictates what private property a prisoner of war may keep and that the prisoner of war must be evacuated from the combat zone as soon as possible.

Section 2 covers the internment of prisoners of war and is broken down into 8 chapters which cover:
General observations  (Articles 21–24)
Quarters, food and clothing (Articles 25–28)
Hygiene and medical attention (Articles 29–32)
The treatment of enemy medical personnel and chaplains retained to assist prisoners of war (Article 33)
Religious, intellectual and physical activities (Articles 34–38)
Discipline (Articles 39–42)
Military rank (Articles 43–45)
Transfer of prisoners of war after their arrival in a camp (Articles 46–48)

Section 3 (Articles 49–57) covers the type of labour that a prisoner of war may be compelled to do, taking such factors as rank, age, and sex into consideration, and that which because it is unhealthy or dangerous can only be done by prisoners of war who volunteer for such work. It goes into details about such things as the accommodation, medical facilities, and that even if the prisoner of war works for a private person the military authority remains responsible for them. Rates of pay for work done are covered by Article 62 in the next section.

Section 4 (Articles 58–68) covers the financial resources of prisoners of war.

Section 5 (Articles 69–74) covers the relations of prisoners of war with the exterior. This covers the frequency of which a prisoner of war can send and receive post, including parcels. The Detaining power has the right to censor all mail, but must do so as quickly as possible.

Section 6 covers the relations between prisoners of war and the detaining authorities: it is broken down into three chapters.
Complaints of prisoners of war respecting the conditions of captivity (Article 78)
Prisoner of war representatives (Articles 79–81). Where there is no senior officer available in a camp the section stipulates that "prisoners shall freely elect by secret ballot, [a representative] every six months". The representative, whether the senior officer or an elected person, acts as a conduit between the authorities of the detaining power and the prisoners.
The sub-section on "Penal and disciplinary sanctions" is subdivided into three parts:
General provisions (Articles 82–88)
Disciplinary sanctions (Articles 89–98)
Juridical proceedings (Articles 99–108)

Part IV: Termination of Captivity
This part is divided into several sections:

Section 1 (Articles 109–117) covers the direct repatriation and accommodation in neutral countries.

Section 2 (Articles 118–119) covers the release and repatriation of prisoners of war at the close of hostilities.

Section 3 (Articles 120–121) covers the death of a prisoner of war.

Part V: Information Bureau and Relief Societies for Prisoners of War

The Information Bureau is an organisation that must be set up by the Detaining Power to facilitate the sharing of information by the parties to conflict and neutral powers as required by the various provisions of the Third Geneva Convention. It will correspond freely with "A Central Prisoners of War Information Agency ... created in a neutral country" to act as a conduit with the Power to which the prisoners of war owe their allegiance. The provisions of this part are contained in Articles 122 to 125.

The central prisoners of war information agency was created within the Red Cross.

Part VI: Execution of the Convention
Consists of two sections.

Section 1  (Articles 126–132) General provisions.

Section 2  (Articles 133–143) Final provisions.

See also 
 Code of the United States Fighting Force
 Command responsibility
 List of parties to the Geneva Conventions
 Unlawful combatant
 War crime

References

External links 

 ICRC Commentaries on the Convention (III) relative to the Treatment of Prisoners of War
 List of countries that have ratified the Third Geneva Convention
 Text of the Third Geneva Convention

3
Treaties concluded in 1949
Treaties entered into force in 1950
Treaties of the Kingdom of Afghanistan
Treaties of the People's Socialist Republic of Albania
Treaties of Algeria
Treaties of Andorra
Treaties of the People's Republic of Angola
Treaties of Antigua and Barbuda
Treaties of Argentina
Treaties of Armenia
Treaties of Australia
Treaties of Austria
Treaties of Azerbaijan
Treaties of the Bahamas
Treaties of Bahrain
Treaties of Bangladesh
Treaties of Barbados
Treaties of the Byelorussian Soviet Socialist Republic
Treaties of Belgium
Treaties of Belize
Treaties of the Republic of Dahomey
Treaties of Bhutan
Treaties of Bolivia
Treaties of Bosnia and Herzegovina
Treaties of Botswana
Treaties of the Second Brazilian Republic
Treaties of Brunei
Treaties of the People's Republic of Bulgaria
Treaties of Burkina Faso
Treaties of Myanmar
Treaties of Burundi
Treaties of the Kingdom of Cambodia (1953–1970)
Treaties of Cameroon
Treaties of Canada
Treaties of Cape Verde
Treaties of the Central African Republic
Treaties of Chad
Treaties of Chile
Treaties of the People's Republic of China
Treaties of Colombia
Treaties of the Comoros
Treaties of the Democratic Republic of the Congo (1964–1971)
Treaties of the Republic of the Congo
Treaties of the Cook Islands
Treaties of Costa Rica
Treaties of Ivory Coast
Treaties of Croatia
Treaties of Cuba
Treaties of Cyprus
Treaties of the Czech Republic
Treaties of Czechoslovakia
Treaties of Denmark
Treaties of Djibouti
Treaties of Dominica
Treaties of the Dominican Republic
Treaties of East Timor
Treaties of Ecuador
Treaties of the Kingdom of Egypt
Treaties of El Salvador
Treaties of Equatorial Guinea
Treaties of Eritrea
Treaties of Estonia
Treaties of the Ethiopian Empire
Treaties of Fiji
Treaties of Finland
Treaties of the French Fourth Republic
Treaties of Gabon
Treaties of the Gambia
Treaties of Georgia (country)
Treaties of West Germany
Treaties of East Germany
Treaties of Ghana
Treaties of the Kingdom of Greece
Treaties of Grenada
Treaties of Guatemala
Treaties of Guinea
Treaties of Guinea-Bissau
Treaties of Guyana
Treaties of Haiti
Treaties of the Holy See
Treaties of Honduras
Treaties of the Hungarian People's Republic
Treaties of Iceland
Treaties of the Dominion of India
Treaties of Indonesia
Treaties of Pahlavi Iran
Treaties of the Kingdom of Iraq
Treaties of Ireland
Treaties of Israel
Treaties of Italy
Treaties of Jamaica
Treaties of Japan
Treaties of Jordan
Treaties of Kazakhstan
Treaties of Kenya
Treaties of Kiribati
Treaties of North Korea
Treaties of South Korea
Treaties of Kuwait
Treaties of Kyrgyzstan
Treaties of the Kingdom of Laos
Treaties of Latvia
Treaties of Lebanon
Treaties of Lesotho
Treaties of Liberia
Treaties of the Kingdom of Libya
Treaties of Liechtenstein
Treaties of Lithuania
Treaties of Luxembourg
Treaties of North Macedonia
Treaties of Madagascar
Treaties of Malawi
Treaties of the Federation of Malaya
Treaties of the Maldives
Treaties of Mali
Treaties of Malta
Treaties of the Marshall Islands
Treaties of Mauritania
Treaties of Mauritius
Treaties of Mexico
Treaties of the Federated States of Micronesia
Treaties of Moldova
Treaties of Monaco
Treaties of the Mongolian People's Republic
Treaties of Montenegro
Treaties of Morocco
Treaties of the People's Republic of Mozambique
Treaties of Namibia
Treaties of Nauru
Treaties of Nepal
Treaties of the Netherlands
Treaties of New Zealand
Treaties of Nicaragua
Treaties of Niger
Treaties of Nigeria
Treaties of Norway
Treaties of Oman
Treaties of the Dominion of Pakistan
Treaties of Palau
Treaties of the State of Palestine
Treaties of Panama
Treaties of Papua New Guinea
Treaties of Paraguay
Treaties of Peru
Treaties of the Philippines
Treaties of the Polish People's Republic
Treaties of the Estado Novo (Portugal)
Treaties of Qatar
Treaties of the Socialist Republic of Romania
Treaties of Rwanda
Treaties of Saint Kitts and Nevis
Treaties of Saint Lucia
Treaties of Saint Vincent and the Grenadines
Treaties of Samoa
Treaties of San Marino
Treaties of São Tomé and Príncipe
Treaties of Saudi Arabia
Treaties of Senegal
Treaties of Serbia and Montenegro
Treaties of Seychelles
Treaties of Sierra Leone
Treaties of Singapore
Treaties of Slovakia
Treaties of Slovenia
Treaties of the Solomon Islands
Treaties of the Somali Republic
Treaties of the Union of South Africa
Treaties of South Sudan
Treaties of the Soviet Union
Treaties of Francoist Spain
Treaties of the Dominion of Ceylon
Treaties of the Republic of the Sudan (1956–1969)
Treaties of Suriname
Treaties of Eswatini
Treaties of Sweden
Treaties of Switzerland
Treaties of the Syrian Republic (1930–1963)
Treaties of Tajikistan
Treaties of Tanganyika
Treaties of Thailand
Treaties of Togo
Treaties of Tonga
Treaties of Trinidad and Tobago
Treaties of Tunisia
Treaties of Turkey
Treaties of Turkmenistan
Treaties of Tuvalu
Treaties of Uganda
Treaties of the Ukrainian Soviet Socialist Republic
Treaties of the United Arab Emirates
Treaties of the United Kingdom
Treaties of the United States
Treaties of Uruguay
Treaties of Uzbekistan
Treaties of Vanuatu
Treaties of Venezuela
Treaties of South Vietnam
Treaties of North Vietnam
Treaties of South Yemen
Treaties of the Yemen Arab Republic
Treaties of Yugoslavia
Treaties of Zambia
Treaties of the Sultanate of Zanzibar
Treaties of Zimbabwe
Treaties extended to Greenland
Treaties extended to the Faroe Islands
Treaties extended to Niue
Treaties extended to Aruba
Treaties extended to the Netherlands Antilles
Treaties extended to the Territory of Papua and New Guinea
Treaties extended to the Belgian Congo
Treaties extended to Ruanda-Urundi
Treaties extended to French Somaliland
Treaties extended to Surinam (Dutch colony)
Treaties extended to Portuguese Macau
Treaties extended to the West Indies Federation
Treaties extended to the Colony of the Bahamas
Treaties extended to Bahrain (protectorate)
Treaties extended to Bermuda
Treaties extended to the British Antarctic Territory
Treaties extended to the Falkland Islands
Treaties extended to the Colony of Fiji
Treaties extended to the Gambia Colony and Protectorate
Treaties extended to Gibraltar
Treaties extended to British Guiana
Treaties extended to British Hong Kong
Treaties extended to the Gilbert and Ellice Islands
Treaties extended to the Sheikhdom of Kuwait
Treaties extended to Basutoland
Treaties extended to the Crown Colony of Malta
Treaties extended to British Mauritius
Treaties extended to the Colony and Protectorate of Nigeria
Treaties extended to Qatar (protectorate)
Treaties extended to Saint Helena, Ascension and Tristan da Cunha
Treaties extended to the Colony of Sierra Leone
Treaties extended to the British Solomon Islands
Treaties extended to South Georgia and the South Sandwich Islands
Treaties extended to Tanganyika (territory)
Treaties extended to the Kingdom of Tonga (1900–1970)
Treaties extended to the Trucial States
Treaties extended to West Berlin

ru:Конвенция об обращении с военнопленными 1929